Dan Werner (born October 9, 1987) is an American former professional basketball player. He played collegiately at the University of Florida and was a freshman member of Florida's 2007 national champion team. Werner regularly started at forward for the Gators from the 2007–08 season until graduating in the spring of 2010.

After college, Werner signed with Bologna of the Italian Basketball League and was loaned to Kaposvári KK of the Hungarian Basketball League for the 2010–11 season.

Early life 

Werner was born in Middletown Township, New Jersey and attended Christian Brothers Academy in New Jersey. He led his high school team to a 27–2 record during his senior year and was honored as New Jersey's "Mr. Basketball" for 2006. Werner originally committed to attend North Carolina State, but reopened the recruiting process after NC State coach Herb Sendek left the school and ended up signing with coach Billy Donovan at Florida.

College career 

Werner was a reserve during his freshman season at Florida behind the "04's" – the Gators' starting five who won two consecutive national championships. Werner played sparingly in the Gators' run through the 2007 NCAA basketball tournament and did not play at all in the team's victory in the championship game against Ohio State.

Each of the "04's" either graduated or left to play professionally after the 2007 championship, thrusting Werner and several other inexperienced players into the Gators' starting lineup. Werner started most games at the forward position but struggled to score throughout his college career. His team also struggled over the next two seasons, missing the NCAA Tournament and finding themselves in the NIT in 2008 and 2009.

Werner suffered a prolonged shooting slump during his senior year and was eventually replaced in the starting lineup by Chandler Parsons. Although his on-court difficulties made Werner the target of criticism and a source of consternation among some Gator fans, coach Billy Donovan defended his player, stating that he does "the little things that nobody sees on the stat sheet" and that while Werner "maybe hasn't been the most athletic or most talented guy, but he's one of the smarter guys I've coached. And Dan has always given his best."

The Gators returned to the NCAA tournament at the end of the 2009–10 season, but lost in the first round to BYU in a contest that went to double overtime. Werner played 36 minutes in his last college game, scoring 4 points and grabbing 5 rebounds.

College Stats

Professional basketball 
In September 2010, Werner signed a 4-year contract to play for Virtus Bologna in the Italian Series A basketball league. and was loaned to Kaposvári KK of the Hungary A-Series Basketball League for the 2010–11 season. Werner started regularly at forward, leading the team in rebounding and 3-point shooting percentage, and was named to the league's All-Star team.

References

External links
bio at gatorzone.com

1987 births
Living people
American expatriate basketball people in Hungary
American expatriate basketball people in Italy
American expatriate basketball people in Ukraine
American men's basketball players
Basketball players from New Jersey
BC Zaporizhya players
Christian Brothers Academy (New Jersey) alumni
Florida Gators men's basketball players
Forwards (basketball)
Kaposvári KK players
People from Middletown Township, New Jersey
Sportspeople from Monmouth County, New Jersey
Virtus Bologna players